Pterostylis falcata, commonly known as the sickle greenhood, is a species of orchid endemic to south-eastern Australia. It has a rosette of bright green leaves at the base of the plant and a single green and white, sickle-shaped flower. It is widespread and often common in Victoria but also occurs further north and west, and in Tasmania

Description
Pterostylis falcata is a terrestrial, perennial, deciduous, herb with an underground tuber and a rosette of three to six bright green leaves surrounding the base of the flowering stem. The dorsal sepal and petals are fused, forming a hood or "galea" over the column. The dorsal sepal is much longer than the petals and gradually tapers to a point. There is a wide gap between the galea and the lateral sepals. Flowering occurs from September to February.

Taxonomy and naming
Pterostylis falcata was first formally described in 1915 by Richard Sanders Rogers and the description was published in Proceedings of the Royal Society of Victoria. The specific epithet (falcata) is a Latin word meaning "curved like a sickle".

Distribution and habitat
The sickle greenhood occurs in the south-eastern states of Australia where it grows in wet places such as near creeks and the rosette is sometimes covered by flowing water. It is most common and widespread in Victoria but is also found in eastern New South Wales, the Australian Capital Territory, Queensland, South Australia and Tasmania but is classed as "endangered" in the last two of these states.

References

falcata
Endemic orchids of Australia
Orchids of the Australian Capital Territory
Orchids of New South Wales
Orchids of Queensland
Orchids of South Australia
Orchids of Tasmania
Orchids of Victoria (Australia)
Plants described in 1915